Feylinia is a genus of skinks (family Scincidae). It is usually placed in the monotypic subfamily Feylininae.

However, it appears to be not as distinct as formerly presumed, but rather somewhat closer to such genera as Chalcides and Sepsina. These are usually placed in the subfamily Scincinae, which seems to be paraphyletic however.

Feylinia belongs to a major clade which does not seem to include the Scincinae type genus Scincus. Thus, it will probably be eventually assigned to a new, yet-to-be-named subfamily. (Austin & Arnold 2006)

Species
The following six species are recognized.
Feylinia boulengeri 
Feylinia currori  - western forest feylinia
Feylinia elegans  - elegant feylinia
Feylinia grandisquamis  - large-scaled burrowing skink
Feylinia macrolepis  
Feylinia polylepis  - manyscaled feylinia

References

Further reading
 (2006). "Using ancient and recent DNA to explore relationships of extinct and endangered Leiolopisma skinks (Reptilia: Scincidae) in the Mascarene islands". Molecular Phylogenetics and Evolution 39 (2): 503–511.  (HTML abstract)

Feylinia
Taxa named by John Edward Gray
Lizard genera